Dame Pattie is an International 12-metre class racing yacht built for the America's Cup challenge series in 1967.  She was designed by Warwick Hood and built by W.H. Barnett in New South Wales, Australia.

The 1967 challenge cost $2 million and was funded by an Australian syndicate headed by Emil Christensen, and represented the Royal Sydney Yacht Squadron. Sir Frank Packer had unsuccessfully challenged in the 1962 series with Gretel. Dame Pattie lost against the revolutionary American defender Intrepid which won the series 4–0.

The yacht was named after Dame Pattie Menzies, the wife of the former Australian Prime Minister, Sir Robert Menzies.

Construction
The yacht's main frames are laminated Queensland Maple, intermediate frames are steambent Danish Ash, to which edgegrain Douglas Fir planking is fastened with silicon bronze screws. Due to the restrictions on use of equipment and materials sourced from outside the defenders country, the Australian syndicate had to obtain permission from the New York Yacht Club to buy the edge grain fir from Stone Brothers Logging, Maple Bay, Vancouver Island, British Columbia.

Dame Pattie subsequently underwent a major refit which included a full reconstruction below decks to provide cabins, galley etc. required for cruising.  She was for some years used for private charters out of Vancouver Island.

In 2008 Dame Pattie was purchased by the Danish architect - Mads Buhl, who brought the Yacht to the French Riviera, where she is still sailing as well as being prepared for future participation in Regattas within the Classic 12MR fleet.

References

Individual sailing vessels
12-metre class yachts
America's Cup challengers
1960s sailing yachts
Sailing yachts built in Australia
1967 America's Cup